Ashwini Sharma is president of Punjab unit of Bharatiya Janata Party. He is a member of state assembly.

References

Living people
Year of birth missing (living people)
Bharatiya Janata Party politicians from Punjab
Members of the Punjab Legislative Assembly